Castejón de Valdejasa (in Aragonese: Castellón de Val de Chasa) is a municipality located in the province of Zaragoza, Aragon, Spain. According to the 2004 census (INE), the municipality has a population of 315 inhabitants.

This town is located within the Castejón Mountains.

References

External links

Castejón de Valdejasa - Cinco Villas
Castejón de Valdejasa - Castillo de Sora

Municipalities in the Province of Zaragoza